The Norwegian Union of Journalists (NJ) is a trade union in Norway. It consists of editorial personnel in newspapers, magazines, television and radio, as well as freelance journalists.

A member organization of the Norwegian Press Association, it is not a part of the Norwegian Confederation of Trade Unions, but negotiates directly with the Norwegian Media Businesses' Association as well as representatives for the television and radio channels NRK, TV 2, TVNorge, Radio 1 and P4 Radio Hele Norge.

It has a twenty-person strong board of directors, a leader and a secretary general.

It publishes the magazine Journalisten, and also co-owns the Norwegian Institute of Journalism, Fredrikstad.

Leaders
Hege Iren Frantzen 2017-
Thomas Spence 2013-2017
Elin Floberghagen 2007–2013
Ann-Magrit Austenå 2003-2007
Olav Njaastad 1999-2003
Diis Bøhn 1995-1999
Alf Skjeseth 1991-1995
Sven Egil Omdal 1987-1991
Anne Skatvedt 1984-1987
Trygve Moe 1970-1983
Ole N. Hoemsnes 1966-1970
Trygve Moe 1964-1966
Ivar Johansen 1962-1964
Vegard Sletten 1956-1962
A. Skjegstad 1949-1956
Vegard Sletten 1946-1949

References

Journalists
Trade unions established in 1946
Organisations based in Oslo
Norwaco